Alexander Volkov defeated MaliVai Washington 7–6(7–2), 6–4 to win the 1993 Benson and Hedges Open singles tennis competition. Jaime Yzaga was the defending champion.

Seeds
A champion seed is indicated in bold text while text in italics indicates the round in which that seed was eliminated.

  MaliVai Washington (final)
  Alexander Volkov (champion)
  Andrei Chesnokov (first round)
  Jaime Yzaga (semifinals)
  Luiz Mattar (semifinals)
  Bernd Karbacher (first round)
  Marcelo Filippini (first round)
  Tomás Carbonell (second round)

Draw

Key
 Q – qualifier
 WC – wild card

References

External links
 ATP Singles draw

Singles
ATP Auckland Open